Cincinnati has a number of fine art repositories, including:
 1305 Gallery - solo shows, local and regional artists
 5th Street Gallery
 ADC Fine Art -large gallery, private events, local art
 Artifact Gallery and Workshop
 ArtWorks Gallery
 BOOM Gallery
 Bunk Spot
 Carl Solway Gallery - work by major contemporary artists
 Carnegie visual and performing art center
 Cincinnati Art Galleries - fine art from 19th century to contemporary artists
 Cincinnati Art Museum
 Contemporary Arts Center
 DAAP Galleries at the University of Cincinnati
 Eisele Gallery of Fine Art at Joseph Ferris House
 Essex Studios
 Fitton Center for Creative Arts (Hamilton)
 Gallery Veronique
 Greenwich House Gallery
 Inlight Studios
 Kennedy Heights Art Center
 Malton Gallery
 Manifest Creative Research Gallery and Drawing Center
 Marta Hewett Gallery
 Mary Ran Gallery
 Miller Gallery
 Pendelton Art Center
 Pendleton Street Photography
 Phyllis Weston Gallery
 Redtree Art Gallery & Coffee Shop
 Rottinghaus Gallery & Custom Framing
 Synthetica M
 Taft Museum of Art
 Village Wine Gallery LLC
 WACC Cultural Center "The Barn"
 Washington Park Art Gallery
 Weston Art Gallery
 Wyoming Wines

References

Arts in Cincinnati
art galleries